The women's sprint competition of the Biathlon World Championships 2011 was held on March 5, 2011 at 18:00 local time. 103 athletes participated.

Results

References

Biathlon World Championships 2011
2011 in Russian women's sport